The following is a list of significant earthquakes for the period 2011–2020, listing earthquakes of magnitude 7 and above, or which caused fatalities. Deaths due to earthquake-caused tsunamis are included.

For lists of earthquakes by country, which may include smaller and less destructive events than those listed here, see Lists of earthquakes by country.

2011

2012

2013

2014

2015

2016

2017

2018

2019

2020

All times are UTC, unless otherwise stated
ML = Richter magnitude scale 
Mw = Moment magnitude 
Mb = Body wave magnitude 
HRV = Harvard University (Global CMT) 
USGS = United States Geological Survey

See also
 List of earthquakes 2001–2010
 List of earthquakes 2021–2030

References

2011–2020